Route 890 is a  long north to south secondary highway in the southern portion of New Brunswick, Canada.

Route description
Most of the route is in Kings County.

The route's northern terminus is in Petitcodiac at Route 885, where it crosses the North River and travels southwest through Hillgrove, Cornhill East, and Cornhill. It then follows South Creek through Newtown and Smiths Creek (where it is known as South Creek Rd), and it ends in Four Corners at Route 1.

History

See also

References

890
890